Biswanarayan Shastri (1918–2002) was a renowned Indologist, Sanskrit scholar par excellence, multi-award winning author, committed educationist and a public servant. He was elected from Lakhimpur, Assam to the Lok Sabha, the lower house of the Parliament of India as a member of the Indian National Congress.

Early life and education

Shastri was born on 11 August 1918, to Rupada Devi and Benikanta Goswami, in a Vainavaite Satra in the Narayanpur area of the present Lakhimpur district of Assam, a place very closely associated with the Kala-Samiti faith of New Vaisnavism. 
He lost his mother, Rupada Devi, at the age of four and was brought up by his paternal grandmother, whom he considered as his mother.

His father, Benikanta Goswami, was a Sanskrit scholar of high repute and the head of a Vaishnava monastery. Thus, from an early age, Shastri was exposed to the study of Sanskrit. 
His father taught him Amarakosha in the traditional oral method and Biswanarayan memorised major parts of the work without a book. 
This formed the foundation for his future study in different branches of Sanskrit literature. He studied Sanskrit literature, grammar, and Indian philosophy at traditional Sanskrit schools or pathshalas in Bihpuria, Nalbari, Kolkata, and Varanasi.

He was a bright student and passed the Aadya examination of Vyakarana of the Assam Sanskrit Board as valedictorian, achieving the highest marks ever, which resulted in securing a scholarship.

He continued studying at the Barada Vidyalaya of Bihpuria with the aid of the scholarships and then migrated to the newly established Sanskrit College at Nalbari. From Nalbari Sanskrit College, he passed the title examination, securing the first rank in the Board exams, earning him cash prizes and medals for his achievement. 
He proceeded to Kolkata and Varanasi and acquired further knowledge in Indian Philosophy. Through the years of study, he obtained the titles of Sahitya Shastri, Vyakarana Shastri, Mimamsa Shastri, Kavyatirtha, and Darsanacharya.

Positions held

A lifetime of service to Assam and India – Dr. Biswanarayan Shastri contributed in various fields and was renowned for his strong intellect, unwavering integrity and sense of duty. 
Principal of North Lakhimpur College 
Special Officer to the Government of Assam
Secretary, Publication Board, Assam
General Secretary, North Lakhimpur District Congress Committee, 1955–58 
Chairman, School Board; North Lakhimpur, 1956–58;
Member of A.P.C.C, 1956–58, 
Member of Executive Board Sahitya Akademy, 1967, 
Member of Central Advisory Board of Education, 1967–70, 
Member of Kendriya Sanskrit Parishad, 1970, 
Member of Rastriya Sanskrit Sansthan, 1970, 
Member of Trade Advisory Council, 1969, 
Member of Central Silk Board, 1967–69, 
Member of Advisory Council Community Development and Panchayati Raj, 1968–70, and 
Member of Assamese Glossary Committee, Government of Assam, 1967; 
President, Assam Research Society, Guwahati, 
Editor, Assam Sahitya Sabha Patrika 1963–65; 
Treasurer, Sangeet Akademy, Assam; 
Member of Fourth & Fifth Lok Sabha, 1967–70, 1971–1976
Member of Privileges Committee, 1968–69,
Member of Consultative Committee on Defence

References

External links
 Official biographical sketch in Parliament of India website
 Facebook page

India MPs 1971–1977
India MPs 1967–1970
Lok Sabha members from Assam
1918 births
2002 deaths
Recipients of the Sahitya Akademi Award in Sanskrit